The Colombian peso (sign: $; code: COP) is the currency of Colombia. Its ISO 4217 code is COP. The official peso symbol is $, with Col$. also being used to distinguish it from other peso- and dollar-denominated currencies.

One peso is theoretically subdivided into one hundred centavos; however, because of high inflation in the 1970s and 1980s, all centavo coins minting was stopped in 1984. The 5, 10, 20 and 50 peso coins are still legal tender, but due to their low value and circulation, most cash transactions are rounded to the nearest 100 pesos.

History
Colombia used Spanish colonial real until 1820, after independence from Spain was achieved. It was replaced by the Colombian real. In 1837, the Colombian real was replaced by the current peso at a rate of 1 peso = 8 reales and was initially subdivided into 8 reales. In 1847, Colombia decimalized the currency and the peso was subdivided into ten reales, each of 10 décimos de reales, later centavos. The real was renamed the décimo in 1853, although the last reales were struck in 1880. The current system of 100 centavos to the peso was first used in 1819 on early banknotes but did not reappear until the early 1860s on banknotes and was not used on the coinage until 1872.

In 1871, Colombia adopted on the gold standard, pegging the peso to the French franc at a rate of 1 peso = 5 francs. This peg only lasted until 1886. From 1888, printing press inflation caused Colombia's paper money (pegged to the British pound at a rate of 5 pesos = 1 pound) to depreciate and the exchange rate between coins and paper money was fixed at 100 peso moneda corriente = 1 coinage peso. Between 1907 and 1914, coins were issued denominated in "peso p/m", equal to paper pesos. In 1910, the Conversion Board began issuing banknotes in the form of peso oro. In 1931, the United Kingdom left the gold standard and the peso shifted its peg to the United States dollar, at a rate of 1.05 pesos = 1 dollar, a slight devaluation from its previous peg, this until 1949. Nevertheless, Peso banknotes continued to be issued expressed as peso oro until 1993.

In 2018, the Congress of Colombia debated whether to redenominate the peso at a rate of 1,000 pesos = 1 new peso, removing three zeroes from its face value, in order to make accounting and banking operations easier. A new series of banknotes was introduced in 2016 with the last three zeroes of the denomination replaced by the word "mil" (thousand), this would enable the printing of the same banknotes with the word "mil" replaced by the word "nuevos" (new). The proposal was supported by then President Juan Manuel Santos, but faced opposition due to the high cost it would have and the minimal benefits it would bring, also confusion in a mostly cash-based economy, contracts made, and the possibility of future inflation rending the changes meaningless, though reduction of inflation was not one of the expected outcomes of the redenomination. President Iván Duque did not support the change, and the proposal is currently not considered by the Government.

Coins
These were mostly continuations of coins issued before 1837 in the name of the Republic of Colombia but with the escudo denominations replaced by pesos. In 1853, silver  and 1 décimo, and gold 10 peso coins were introduced, followed by 2 décimos in 1854 and 1 peso in 1855, both in silver. In 1856, gold 5 peso coins were added.

The United States of New Grenada issued silver 1 décimo and 1 peso in 1861.

Beginning in 1862, coins were issued by the United States of Colombia. With the introduction of the centavo in 1872, silver , 5, 10, 20, and 50 centavos were issued, followed by cupro-nickel  centavos in 1874 and cupro-nickel  centavos in 1881.

In 1886, the country's name reverted to the Republic of Colombia. The first issues were cupro-nickel 5 centavos. Except for silver 50 centavos (also denominated 5 décimos) issued between 1887 and 1889, no other denominations were issued until 1897, when silver 10 and 20 centavos were introduced. Silver 5 centavos were issued in 1902

In 1907, following the stabilization of the paper money, cupro-nickel 1, 2 and 5 pesos p/m were introduced and issued until 1916. In 1913, after the pegging of the peso to sterling, gold  and 5 peso coins were introduced which were of the same weight and composition as the half sovereign and sovereign.

In 1918, the 1, 2 and 5 pesos p/m coins were replaced by 1, 2 and 5 centavo coins of the same size and composition. In 1942, bronze 1 and 5 centavo coins were introduced, followed by bronze 2 centavos in 1948. Between 1952 and 1958, cupro-nickel replaced silver in the 10, 20 and 50 centavos.

In 1967, copper-clad-steel 1 and 5 centavos were introduced, together with nickel-clad-steel 10, 20 and 50 centavos and cupro-nickel 1 peso coins, the 2 centavos having ceased production in 1960. In 1977, bronze 2 pesos were introduced. In 1984, production of all coins below 1 peso ended. Higher denominations were introduced in the following years of high inflation. 5 peso coins were introduced in 1980, followed by 10 pesos in 1981, 20 pesos in 1982, 50 pesos in 1986, 100 pesos in 1992, 200 pesos in 1994, 500 pesos in 1993 and 1000 pesos in 1996. However, due to massive counterfeiting problems, the 1000 pesos was withdrawn by stages. By 2002, the coin was out of circulation.

In February 2009, the central bank stopped the minting of 5, 10, 20 peso coins. They were still legal tender, but due to their low value and circulation, most cash transactions were rounded to the nearest 100 pesos.

In 2012, the Bank of the Republic of Colombia issued a new series of coins with the 500 and 1000 peso coins now struck as Bi-metallic coins.

Banknotes
Between 1857 and 1880, five of Colombia's then provinces, Bolívar, Cauca, Cundinamarca, Panama and Santander issued their own paper money. Denominations included 10¢ and 50¢, 1, 2, 3, 5, 10, 50 and 100 pesos.

In the early 1860s, banknotes were issued in denominations of 20¢ and 1, 2, 3, 10, 20 and 100 pesos, with all denominations also given in reales. In 1881, the Banco Nacional introduced notes for 20¢, and 1, 5, 10, 20, 50 and 100 pesos. These were followed by 50¢ notes in 1882 and 10¢ in 1885. 1,000 peso notes were introduced in 1895 and 500 peso notes in 1900. In 1904, the Treasury took over paper money production, issuing 1, 2, 5, 10, 25, 50 and 100 peso notes, followed by 1,000 pesos in 1908. In 1910, the Conversion Board introduced 50 and 100 peso notes, followed by 1, 2, 5 and 10 pesos in 1915.

More than sixty retail banks issued banknotes between 1865 and 1923. Denominations issued included 10¢, 20¢, 25¢, 50¢, and 1, 2, 5, 10, 20, 25, 50, 100 and 500 pesos.

In 1923, the Banco de la República monopolized paper money production and introduced notes denominated in peso oro. Regular issues followed for 1, 2, 5, 10, 50, 100, and 500 pesos oro. Twenty peso notes were introduced in 1927.

In 1932 and 1941, silver certificates were issued for 1 and 5 pesos plata, although 1 and 5 peso oro notes continued to be produced. Treasury notes for 5 and 10 pesos oro were issued in 1938, followed by  peso oro between 1948 and 1953. Half peso oro notes were also produced by the Banco de la República in 1943 by cutting in half 1 peso notes.

The Banco de la República introduced 200 and 1,000 peso oro notes in 1974 and 1979, respectively, whilst 1 and 2 peso oro notes ceased production in 1977, followed by 10 pesos oro in 1980, 5 pesos oro in 1981, 20 pesos in 1983 and 50 pesos in 1986. 500 pesos oro notes were introduced in 1986 with 10,000 pesos oro in 1992. Production of 100 peso oro notes ended in 1991, followed by that of the 200 pesos oro in 1992 and 500 pesos oro in 1993. In 1993, the word oro was dropped. 20,000 peso notes were introduced in 1996, followed by 50,000 pesos in 2000.

In November 2006, the 1,000 and 2,000 peso notes were reduced in size from 140 × 70 mm to 130 × 65 mm, because these notes are frequently replaced due to heavy use.

In December 2010, the Banco de la República issued a 2,000 peso note that now includes the number "2" expressed in Braille in the watermark area.

In 2016, the Banco de la Republica issued a new series of banknotes in denominations of 2,000, 5,000, 10,000, 20,000, 50,000 and 100,000 pesos, with the latter being a new and the highest denomination. These banknotes give continuity of biodiversity present in the new series of coins that began circulating in 2012, while highlighting a group of cultural elements and landscapes of Colombia's geography. Additionally, the notes pay tribute to major personalities of culture, science and politics, and reinforces recognition of women's important role in Colombian society. The new 100,000 pesos banknote was introduced on 31 March 2016, followed by the 20,000 pesos note on 30 June 2016, the 50,000 pesos note on 19 August 2016, the 5,000 pesos note on 9 November 2016, and the 2,000 pesos note on 29 November 2016. The 10,000 pesos note was issued on 7 December 2016, completing the new banknote series.

Use in Venezuela
The crisis in Venezuela has caused an economic crisis in which the value of the bolívar declined rapidly, resulting in hyperinflation. Some areas in Venezuela informally accept the peso for transactions, alongside the United States dollar.

The state of Táchira adopted the Colombian peso as legal tender, and the bolívar is rarely used.

Unidad de Valor Real (UVR) 
The  ("real value unit", UVR, ISO 4217 code ) is an accounting cureency, maintained by the Banco de la Republíca, that reflects inflation and purchase power. It is used to calculate the cost of housing loans which allows financial entities to maintain the purchasing power of borrowed money.

See also
 Economy of Colombia
 Vertical currency

References

Bibliography

External links

 Colombia Coin Patterns and Krause Corrections by Guillermo Granados 
 USD/COP Exchange Rate Analysis
 Historical and current banknotes of Colombia 

Peso
1837 introductions
Currencies of South America